The 1960 United States presidential election in Indiana took place on November 8, 1960, as part of the 1960 United States presidential election. State voters chose 13 representatives, or electors, to the Electoral College, who voted for president and vice president.

Indiana was won by incumbent Vice President Richard Nixon (R–California), running with United States Ambassador to the United Nations Henry Cabot Lodge, Jr., with 55.03% of the popular vote, against Senator John F. Kennedy (D–Massachusetts), running with Senator Lyndon B. Johnson, with 44.60% of the popular vote.

Primaries

Democratic primary

Indiana's Democratic primary had 34 delegates at stake.

Larry O'Brien's first campaign trip for the Kennedy campaign was a five day trip to Indiana in April 1959. He determined that, "there was no great groundswell for Kennedy" in the state. However  he found no signs of an active Symington effort in state. O'Brien found that the field was relatively clear in the state, with only whispers of a possible favorite son candidate running to lead a unified and uncommitted delegation to the convention, with Vance Hartke being a favorite speculative individual to fill such a role.

Stuart Symington ultimately made a decision to abandon plans of actively competing in primaries. This opened up Indiana to other candidates. Symington, a Missourian, would have had a distinct advantage winning the vote of winning votes in another Midwestern state with a similar electorate to his own state.

Republican primary

Nixon ran unopposed in the Republican primary.

General election

Results

Results by county

See also
 United States presidential elections in Indiana

References

Indiana
1960
1960 Indiana elections